Jeffrey Allen Manchester is an American convicted spree-robber and former United States Army Reserve officer known as the 'Rooftop Robber' or simply 'Roofman' due to his modus operandi of entering his targets (most commonly McDonald's locations) by drilling through the roof and dropping in. Before being apprehended for the second time in 2005 in Charlotte, North Carolina, Manchester used the alias John Zorn from June 2004 to January 2005.

Crime spree 
Beginning in November 1998, Manchester began robbing chiefly McDonald's locations across the United States. His modus operandi consisted of meticulous planning and observation before drilling, hacking, or sawing through the roof of the target building during the night or the early hours of the morning and waiting, often in a restroom, for the morning shift workers to come in. Once Manchester believed normal activities had begun, he would storm out of the bathroom carrying a firearm and hold up employees before ushering them into the freezer, locking them inside while he robbed the cash registers.

Throughout his robberies, Manchester would maintain a very gentle and cordial demeanor, almost never resorting to violence throughout his estimated 40–60 robberies across the country, with some victims stating he had suggested donning a coat before entering the freezer.

Initial capture and incarceration 
After two years, Manchester was apprehended by North Carolina police officials on May 20, 2000, after robbing two McDonald's in the same day wielding a .22 caliber rifle. After a silent alarm had been hit by an employee at the second location, police began to search for the robber. Manchester, who had earlier parked his car in a church parking lot, was spotted coming out of nearby woods to get to his vehicle by a police officer, and was later apprehended after fleeing back into the woods.

During interrogation, Manchester confessed to the robberies, and attempted to convince officers he was inspired by another robber he had heard about, though they were already convinced of Manchester's guilt to all the crimes done by the Roofman. Eventually, he would only be convicted of the two robberies committed on May 20, and sentenced to 45 years in prison. Manchester was moved from several North Carolinian prisons before ending up in Brown Creek Correctional Institution in Polkton.

Escape 
While incarcerated at Brown Creek, Manchester worked in the prison's metal shop, attempting to use his position to devise an escape plan over the four years he would be in the facility. After observing trucks coming in and out of the prison, Manchester crafted a plywood platform, which he spray-painted black, along with some cardboard. On June 15, he hid in an outgoing truck's undercarriage, using the plywood platform and cardboard to conceal his body should gate guards inspect the truck. Following his escape, Manchester hitchhiked to Charlotte.

Toys "R" Us robbery and recapture 
Upon reaching Charlotte, Manchester lived in a Charlotte Toys "R" Us store, staying in backrooms and other areas inside, surviving on kids' snacks and baby food, and exercising during the night when the store was closed by riding a bike throughout the store aisles. During the holiday rush of December 2004, Manchester moved his living quarters to an abandoned Circuit City next-door to avoid detection, creating a room under a stairwell where he painted the walls, put up posters, and passed the time watching movies during the day.

Between June and January of the following year, Manchester devised an elaborate plan to takeover and rob the Toys "R" Us in his biggest robbery to-date, setting up an elaborate surveillance system throughout the store using baby monitors, and even subtly changing employee schedules to accommodate his plans. As time passed, he came under more and more suspicion as employees noticed many missing items as a result of Manchester's residence, making his plans tighter.

In the time that Manchester lived in Charlotte, he became a member of the community to bide time until the robbery, even dating a local woman, Leigh Wainscott, and joining the Crossroads Presbyterian Church. He spent a large amount of his time with Wainscott and her kids, bringing them toys he had pilfered from the store he lived at, and covering his seeming unemployment and homelessness with secretive whispers about a highly-confidential job for the government, saying his quarters were in a restricted office building.

Prior to committing the Toys "R" Us robbery, Manchester burned down a Charlotte dentist's office where he had gotten work on his teeth done during his time there, and reportedly robbed a pawn shop to acquire a gun in preparation for the robbery. On the morning of December 26, Manchester robbed the Toys "R" Us, taking an unknown amount of cash before being forced to flee after two employees were able to slip out of the store to get law enforcement, leading to police discovery of Manchester's secret lodgings in Circuit City.

Despite having committed the robbery, Manchester did not leave Charlotte. After informing Wainscott of Manchester's true identity, who she believed to be a man named "John Zorn", the police convinced Wainscott to call Manchester to her home on January 5, where he was recaptured upon arrival.

Following his January recapture, a December trial found Manchester guilty of numerous charges relating to his Charlotte crimes, and sentenced him to upwards of 40 years in prison, where he remains as of 2022, with a scheduled release date in the 2030s.

References 

Living people
American people convicted of robbery
American escapees
Year of birth missing (living people)